Bugat is a sum (district) of Bayan-Ölgii Province in western Mongolia. It is primarily inhabited by ethnic Kazakhs. As of 2014 it had a population of 3487 people.

Since 1999, Bugat has hosted The Gold Eagle Festival.  The Golden Eagle Festival is the largest gathering of eagle hunters and their eagles and is recognized as a UNESCO World Heritage Cultural Event.

References

Populated places in Mongolia
Districts of Bayan-Ölgii Province